was a town located in Nishimorokata District, Miyazaki Prefecture, Japan.

As of 2003, the town had an estimated population of 8,705 and the density of 97.96 persons per km2. The total area was 88.86 km2.

On March 23, 2010, Nojiri was merged into the expanded city of Kobayashi and no longer exists as an independent municipality.

References

External links
Kobayashi official website 

Dissolved municipalities of Miyazaki Prefecture